Norman Carlyle Burns (February 20, 1918 – February 23, 1995) was a Canadian ice hockey centre. He played for the New York Rangers. Burns was born in Youngstown, Alberta.

References

External links

1918 births
1995 deaths
Canadian ice hockey centres
Cleveland Barons (1937–1973) players
Ice hockey people from Alberta
New Haven Eagles players
New Haven Ramblers players
New York Rangers players
Springfield Indians players
Washington Lions players